The 2015 Copa Argentina Final was the 218th and final match of the 2014–15 Copa Argentina. It was played on November 4, 2015 at the Estadio Mario Alberto Kempes de Córdoba between Rosario Central and Boca Juniors. Boca Juniors won the match 2–0. As champion, Boca Juniors qualified for the 2015 Supercopa Argentina. As runners-up, Rosario Central qualified for the 2016 Copa Libertadores.

Qualified teams

Road to the final

Match

Details

Statistics

References

2015 in Argentine football
2014-15
2014–15 domestic association football cups
a
a